Bauke Roolvink (31 January 1912 – 25 November 1979) was a Dutch politician of the defunct Anti-Revolutionary Party (ARP) now merged into the Christian Democratic Appeal (CDA) party and trade union leader

Roolvink worked as a foundry-man at a shipyard in Leeuwarden from May 1928 until July 1929 and as a machine operator at a factory in Hilversum from July 1929 until April 1946. Roolvink worked as a trade union leader for the National Federation of Christian Trade Unions (CNV) from April 1946 until June 1959 and served as general-secretary of the executive board from December 1952 until June 1959. Roolvink served on the Municipal Council of Hilversum from September 1949 until 15 June 1959

After the election of 1959 Roolvink was appointed as State Secretary for Social Affairs and Health in the Cabinet De Quay, taking office on 15 June 1959. Roolvink was elected as a Member of the House of Representatives after the election of 1963, taking office on 2 July 1963. Following the cabinet formation of 1963 Roolvink was not giving a cabinet post in the new cabinet, the Cabinet De Quay was replaced by the Cabinet Marijnen on 24 July 1963 and he continued to serve in the House of Representatives as a frontbencher and the de facto Whip. On 27 February 1965 the Cabinet Marijnen fell and continued to serve in a demissionary capacity until the cabinet formation of 1965 with the Parliamentary leader of the Anti-Revolutionary Party in the House of Representatives Jan Smallenbroek appointed as Minister of the Interior in the Cabinet Cals, the Anti-Revolutionary Party leadership approached Roolvink as his successor as Parliamentary leader, Roolvink accepted and became the Parliamentary leader, taking office on 14 April 1965. After the election of 1967 the Leader of the Anti-Revolutionary Party Barend Biesheuvel returned to the House of Representatives and took over as Parliamentary leader on 23 February 1967. Following the cabinet formation of 1967 Roolvink was appointed as Minister of Social Affairs and Health in the Cabinet De Jong, taking office on 5 April 1967. After the election of 1971 Roolvink returned as Member of the House of Representatives, taking office on 11 May 1971. Following the cabinet formation of 1971 Roolvink was not giving a cabinet post in the new cabinet, the Cabinet De Jong was replaced by the Cabinet Biesheuvel I on 6 July 1971 and he continued to serve in the House of Representatives as a frontbencher chairing the special parliamentary committee for Protection of Employment and the special parliamentary committee for Income Policies and spokesperson for Social Affairs, Economic Affairs and Employment. Roolvink also became active in the private sector and public sector and occupied numerous seats as a corporate director and nonprofit director on several boards of directors and supervisory boards (DSM Company, Gulf Oil, AVEBE, RDM Company and the International Institute of Social History). In February 1977 Roolvink announced his retirement from national politics and that he wouldn't stand for the election of 1977 and continued to serve until the end of the parliamentary term on 8 June 1977.

Roolvink was known for his abilities as a debater and manager. Roolvink continued to comment on political affairs until his is death at the age of 67 and holds the distinction as the last serving Minister of Social Affairs and Health.

Decorations

References

External links

Official
  B. (Bauke) Roolvink Parlement & Politiek

 

1912 births
1979 deaths
20th-century Dutch businesspeople
20th-century Dutch educators
20th-century Dutch politicians
Anti-Revolutionary Party politicians
Commanders of the Order of Orange-Nassau
Dutch corporate directors
Dutch expatriates in Germany
Dutch nonprofit directors
Dutch nonprofit executives
Dutch people of World War II
Dutch trade union leaders
Foundrymen
Knights of the Order of the Netherlands Lion
Metalworkers
Ministers of Health of the Netherlands
Ministers of Social Affairs of the Netherlands
Members of the House of Representatives (Netherlands)
Members of the Social and Economic Council
Municipal councillors of Hilversum
People from Baarn
People from Leeuwarderadeel
Reformed Churches Christians from the Netherlands
State Secretaries for Health of the Netherlands
State Secretaries for Social Affairs of the Netherlands
Welders